Pointe Helbronner is a mountain in the Mont Blanc massif in the Graian Alps on the watershed between France and Italy.

The peak, which used to be a mere geodetic reference point, was named after Paul Helbronner, a French polytechnicien, alpinist and geodesist who pioneered cartography of the French Alps.

This, in turn, gives access to the French Téléphérique de l'Aiguille du Midi, the cable car connecting Aiguille du Midi to the French village of Chamonix, Courmayeur's sister "city".

The Skyway Monte Bianco station platform on Pointe Helbronner offers a remarkable view over the Aosta Valley and the Piedmont region. The French-Italian border splits this platform.

Pointe Helbronner is the starting point of a ski run via the Glacier du Géant and the Mer de Glace to Montenvers and Chamonix.  The mountain is the starting point of various routes to other mountains on the Mont Blanc massif, with many mountaineers staying at the nearby Refuge Torino.

In June 2015,  Italian Prime Minister Matteo Renzi expressed repeated claims on the territory.

References

External links
Point Helbronner on French IGN mapping portal

Alpine three-thousanders
Mountains of the Alps
Mountains of Haute-Savoie
Mountains of Aosta Valley
Vertical transport devices